Ragnhild Aarflot Kalland (born 4 September 1960) is a Norwegian politician for the Centre Party.

She served as a deputy representative to the Norwegian Parliament from Møre og Romsdal during the terms 2001–2005 and 2005–2009.

On the local level, she was mayor of Volda municipality from 2003 to 2011.

References

1960 births
Living people
Deputy members of the Storting
Centre Party (Norway) politicians
Mayors of places in Møre og Romsdal
Women mayors of places in Norway
20th-century Norwegian women politicians
20th-century Norwegian politicians
Women members of the Storting
People from Volda